Bonate Sotto is a comune (municipality) in the Province of Bergamo in the Italian region of Lombardy, located about  northeast of Milan and about  southwest of Bergamo in the Isola bergamasca.

Outside the town are the remains of the Romanesque Basilica di Santa Giulia.

References

External links
 Official website